Verkhneyaikbayevo (Ürge Yayıqbay) is a rural locality (a village) in Nigamatovsky Selsoviet, Baymaksky District, Bashkortostan, Russia. The population was 390 as of 2010. There are 6 streets.

Geography 
Verkhneyaikbayevo is located 33 km northwest of Baymak (the district's administrative centre) by road. Nigamatovo is the nearest rural locality.

References 

Rural localities in Baymaksky District